Vivian Louise Brown is an American television meteorologist who worked for The Weather Channel. She most recently co-hosted Weather Center Live from noon to 3pm on weekdays. Brown was with The Weather Channel from 1986 to 2015. Brown formerly co-hosted Day Planner until it was cancelled in 2013 and replaced by the all-day form of Weather Center Live.

Early life and education
Brown was born in Greenville, Mississippi but then later moved to Jackson, Mississippi in her teen years. Brown graduated with a degree in meteorology from Jackson State University in 1986.

Career
In her 29-year career with The Weather Channel, Brown hosted Afternoon Outlook from 2003 to 2006, PM Edition Weekend from 2006 to 2010, Day Planner from 2010 to 2013, and Weather Center Live from 2013 to 2015. Brown made the announcement she was leaving the Weather Channel during her final broadcast on 1 September 2015. She said "I do not know exactly where I'm going next, but I do know for sure that it will be in accordance to God's will."

Personal life
Brown is married and has three children.

See also
 List of personalities on The Weather Channel

References

External links
 Vivian Brown on Facebook
 Vivian Brown on Twitter
 

American television meteorologists
The Weather Channel people
Living people
African-American television personalities
Year of birth missing (living people)
21st-century African-American people